Diane Evelyn Caldwell (born 11 September 1988) is an Irish professional footballer who plays as a defender for Reading of the English Women's Super League and the Republic of Ireland national team.

Having played in her native Ireland with Raheny United, Caldwell moved to the United States to play collegiately at Hofstra University in 2006. She went on to play in three American leagues: the USL W-League with Hudson Valley Quickstrike, Women's Premier Soccer League with Albany Alleycats and National Women's Soccer League with North Carolina Courage. Caldwell has also played in Iceland for Þór/KA, in Norway with Avaldsnes IL, for German clubs 1. FC Köln and SC Sand, and in England with Manchester United and Reading

Early life
Born in Balbriggan, County Dublin, Caldwell attended Mount Temple Comprehensive School and played for local club Balbriggan FC. In January 2006, she moved to Raheny United of the Dublin Women's Soccer League.

College career
In autumn 2006, Caldwell enrolled at Hofstra University and played four seasons for Hofstra Pride while studying for a bachelor's in physical education teaching. She played in 15 games in her debut year including 14 starts, scoring once, the tying goal late in a 2–1 comeback win over Fordham. She was named to the Colonial Athletic Association All-Rookie team. In 2007, Hofstra won the CAA Tournament title with a 1–0 win over VCU Rams. Caldwell assisted the game-winner in the final. In total, Caldwell made 76 appearances and scored eight goals.

Having exhausted her college eligibility for football, Caldwell returned to Hofstra to study for a master's in sports science in 2010. She tried out for the field hockey team in spring, eventually earning a place for the 2010 season. She had previously played hockey as a teenager and was offered a trial for Leinster but declined to focus on football.

Club career
In 2011, Caldwell was named to the preseason roster of Women's Professional Soccer (WPS) franchise magicJack but did not sign for the team. Instead, Caldwell played for Albany Alleycats in the Women's Premier Soccer League (WPSL) in 2011 before joining Icelandic Úrvalsdeild team Þór/KA to finish the 2011 campaign. She scored two goals in eight appearances in all competitions including in a Champions League round of 32 match against Turbine Potsdam.

Avaldsnes
Ahead of the 2012 season, Caldwell moved to Avaldsnes IL of the Norwegian 1. divisjon. She played in 20 of 22 league games as Avaldsnes finished top and won promotion to the Toppserien. In the following three seasons, Avaldsnes retained their Toppserien status with 4th, 5th and 2nd-place finishes with the latter qualifying the team for the UEFA Women's Champions League for the first time, and also reached two Norwegian Women's Cup finals: losing both the 2013 final 1–0 to Stabæk and 3–2 to LSK Kvinner in 2015. With the owner heavily investing in the club including bringing in national team players from Norway, Sweden, Iceland and Brazil, Caldwell faced heavy competition for her place in the squad during the 2015 season. Under the new management of Tom Nordlie, Caldwell was limited to four appearances in 2015 and decided to leave at the end of the season: "At that time, a new coach had come in. I was working really hard to try to prove him wrong, but he obviously didn't fancy me as a player, didn't give me a chance." In total she played 66 games for Avaldsnes and scored eight goals.

1. FC Köln
In January 2016, Caldwell joined 2015–16 Frauen-Bundesliga strugglers 1. FC Köln on a short-term deal as the club looked to bolster in a bid to stave off relegation. However, Caldwell played in six matches, all defeats, as Köln dropped out of the league.

SC Sand
She left at the end of the season, opting to remain in the Bundesliga with SC Sand following a successful trial with the club. She made 24 appearances in all competitions in her first season with the club including in the 2017 DFB-Pokal Final as Sand lost 2–1 to Wolfsburg for the second consecutive final. She cited her spell at SC Sand, particularly under Colin Bell who signed her for Sand and would later manage the Irish national team, as a rejuvenating experience following tough periods with Avaldsnes and Köln. Bell most notably took Caldwell from being a versatile utility player in midfield and at full-back, and told her to focus playing at centre-back. During the COVID-19 pandemic with Germany in a lockdown and the Bundesliga still suspended, Caldwell and her Sand teammates volunteered as farm labourers to pick asparagus and strawberries to cover for the migrant worker shortage. In August 2020, Caldwell was named captain in place of the departing Anne van Bonn ahead of the 2020–21 season. Caldwell left SC Sand midway through the season to pursue another playing opportunity.

North Carolina Courage
On 19 January 2021, Caldwell returned to the United States to join North Carolina Courage of the National Women's Soccer League, signing a one-year contract with an additional option year. In December 2021, North Carolina declined Caldwell's contract option at the end of the season. She had made eight appearances for the club.

Manchester United
On 27 January 2022, Caldwell signed a short-term contract with Women's Super League club Manchester United for the remainder of the 2021–22 season. She made six appearances in all competitions before leaving the club at the end of her contract on 30 June 2022.

Reading
On 11 August 2022, Caldwell signed with Reading of the English Women's Super League.

International career
Caldwell made her Republic of Ireland under-17 debut at 14-years-old. She appeared during qualifying cycles for the 2005 and 2006 UEFA Women's Under-19 Championship, earning 18 caps up to under-19 level by 2005.

On 15 March 2006, Caldwell made her senior Republic of Ireland debut at the age of 17, appearing in a 4–0 defeat to Denmark in the 2006 Algarve Cup. Her first competitive appearance came later that month, in a 2–0 2007 FIFA World Cup qualifying defeat by Switzerland at Gurzelen Stadion.

Having agreed with Hofstra to be released for any international call-ups, either under-19 or senior, Caldwell was frozen out of international contention by manager Noel King after he threatened to leave her out if she didn't attend the 2009 World Student Games in July 2009, something Hofstra had not agreed on as an unofficial non-FIFA competition.

She was not recalled until King was replaced by Susan Ronan who named Caldwell in her first squad, a friendly against Switzerland in August 2011. Caldwell scored her first senior international goal on 6 March 2013 in a 5–1 win over Northern Ireland in the 2013 Cyprus Women's Cup, her 21st cap and her first playing in the number seven shirt following the retirement of Ciara Grant the previous month.

In Autumn 2021 Ireland coach Vera Pauw dropped Caldwell from the starting line-up in favour of Savannah McCarthy, but insisted that Caldwell remained an important player: "It doesn’t mean she's out forever, she's a very good player Diane Caldwell, and I've huge respect for her. But we are professionals and we need to win games." Caldwell captained Ireland for the first time on 19 February 2022, in a 1–0 defeat by Russia at the 2022 Pinatar Cup.

Career statistics

Club
.

International goals
 As of 11 March 2020. Ireland score listed first, score column indicates score after each Caldwell goal.

Honours
Hofstra Pride
Colonial Athletic Association Tournament: 2007

Avaldsnes IL
1. divisjon: 2012

References

External links
Diane Caldwell  at UEFA
Diane Caldwell at FAI

1988 births
Living people
People from Balbriggan
Sportspeople from Fingal
People educated at Mount Temple Comprehensive School
Women's association football defenders
Women's association football midfielders
Republic of Ireland women's association footballers
Republic of Ireland women's youth international footballers
Republic of Ireland women's international footballers
Republic of Ireland expatriate association footballers
Raheny United F.C. players
Women's National League (Ireland) players
Hofstra Pride women's soccer players
USL W-League (1995–2015) players
Women's Premier Soccer League players
Diane Caldwell
Úrvalsdeild kvenna (football) players
Expatriate women's footballers in Iceland
Irish expatriate sportspeople in Iceland
Avaldsnes IL players
Toppserien players
Expatriate women's footballers in Norway
Irish expatriate sportspeople in Norway
1. FC Köln (women) players
Frauen-Bundesliga players
Expatriate women's footballers in Germany
Irish expatriate sportspeople in Germany
SC Sand players
North Carolina Courage players
National Women's Soccer League players
Expatriate women's soccer players in the United States
Irish expatriate sportspeople in the United States
Manchester United W.F.C. players
Reading F.C. Women players
Women's Super League
Expatriate women's footballers in England
Irish expatriate sportspeople in England